Georgetown is an unincorporated community in Short Creek Township, Harrison County, Ohio, United States.

History
Georgetown was platted in 1814 by George Riggle, and named for him.

References

Unincorporated communities in Harrison County, Ohio